The Namesake is a 2006 English-language drama film directed by Mira Nair and written by Sooni Taraporevala based on the novel The Namesake by Jhumpa Lahiri. It stars Kal Penn, Tabu, Irrfan Khan and Sahira Nair. The film was produced by Indian, American and Japanese studios. The film was released in the United States on 9 March 2007, following screenings at film festivals in Toronto and New York City. The Namesake received positive reviews from American critics.

Plot
The Namesake depicts the struggles of Ashoke and Ashima Ganguli, first-generation immigrants from the state of West Bengal to the United States, and their American-born children Gogol and Sonia. The film takes place primarily in Kolkata, New York City, and suburbs of New York City.

The story begins as Ashoke and Ashima leave Calcutta and settle in New York City. Through a series of miscues, their son's nickname, Gogol (named after Russian author Nikolai Gogol), becomes his official birth name, an event which will shape many aspects of his life. The story chronicles Gogol's cross-cultural experiences  and his exploration of his Indian heritage, as the story shifts between the United States and India.

Gogol becomes a lazy, pot-smoking teenager indifferent to his cultural background. He resents many of the customs and traditions his family upholds and doesn't understand his parents. After a summer trip to India before starting college at Yale, Gogol starts opening up to his culture and becomes more accepting of it.

After college, Gogol uses his "good name" Nikhil (later shortened to Nick). He works as an architect and dates Maxine (Jacinda Barrett), a white American woman from a wealthy background, who is clueless about their cultural differences. Gogol falls in love with Maxine and introduces her to his parents, who struggle to understand his modern, American perspectives on dating, marriage and love. They are hesitant and guarded when meeting her. Gogol gets along with Maxine's family and feels closer to them than he does his own family.

Before he goes to Ohio for a teaching apprenticeship, Ashoke tells Gogol the story of how he came up with his name. Shortly after, while Gogol is on vacation with Maxine's family, Ashoke dies. Grieving, Gogol tries to be more like what he thinks his parents want him to be and begins following cultural customs more closely. He grows distant from Maxine and eventually breaks up with her.

Gogol rekindles a friendship with Moushumi (Zuleikha Robinson), the daughter of family friends. They begin dating and soon after get married. However, the marriage is short-lived as Moushumi, bored with being a wife, starts having an affair with an old boyfriend from Paris. Gogol divorces her, while Ashima blames herself for pressuring Gogol to marry a fellow Bengali. Gogol returns home to help Ashima pack the house when he finds the book Ashoke gave him as a graduation present. Searching for comfort, and accepting his new life alone, Gogol finally reads the stories written by his namesake on the train home.

As well as depicting Gogol/Nikhil's experiences, the film describes the courtship and marriage of Ashima and Ashoke, and the effect on the family from Ashoke's early death from a massive heart attack. Through experiencing his father's funeral rites on the banks of the Ganges, Gogol begins to appreciate Indian culture. Ashima's decision to move on with her life, selling the suburban family home and returning to Calcutta for part of each year, unifies and ends the story.

Cast
Kal Penn as Nikhil "Gogol" Ganguli
Soham Chatterjee as child Gogol aged 4 years
Tabu as Ashima Ganguli
Irrfan Khan as Ashoke Ganguli
Sahira Nair as Sonia Ganguli
Jacinda Barrett as Maxine Ratcliffe
Sebastian Roché as Chris Wright
Linus Roache as Mr Joshua Lawson (Gogol's teacher)
Glenne Headly as Lydia
Zuleikha Robinson as Moushumi Majumdar
Ruma Guha Thakurta as Ashoke's mother
Sabyasachi Chakrabarty as Ashima's father
Supriya Devi as Ashima's grandmother
Jagannath Guha as Ghosh
Sukanya Chakraborty as Rini
Tanushree Shankar as Ashima's mother
Tamal Roy Choudhury as Ashoke's father
Jhumpa Lahiri as Jhumpa Mashi

The film has cameo appearances by actor Samrat Chakrabarti, academic Partha Chatterjee and visual artist Naeem Mohaiemen.

Development
Initially Rani Mukerji was considered for the principal lead, but due to scheduling conflicts, the role went to Tabu. Kal Penn was recommended for the movie by John Cho and strongly requested by Nair's son, who was a fan of Penn in Harold and Kumar.

Soundtrack
The soundtrack has varied music: Indian, Anglo-Indian (by Nitin Sawhney, influenced by Ravi Shankar's music for Pather Panchali), and a French piece. One British Indian electronica piece is State of Bengal's "IC408." The ringtone from Moushumi's mobile phone is the song "Riviera Rendezvous" by Ursula 1000 from the album Kinda' Kinky; this is the same song that is played when Gogol and Moushumi first sleep together. The Indian classical pieces (performed on screen by Tabu) were sung by Mitali Banerjee Bhawmik, a New Jersey-based musician.

Critical reception
The film received favorable reviews from critics. As of 23 February 2009, the review aggregator Rotten Tomatoes reported that 86% of critics gave the film positive reviews, based on 126 reviews. Metacritic reported the film had an average score of 82 out of 100, based on 33 reviews, indicating "universal acclaim".

Top ten lists
The film appeared on several critics' top ten lists of the best films of 2007.

6th - Peter Rainer, The Christian Science Monitor
8th - Carrie Rickey, The Philadelphia Inquirer
8th - Claudia Puig, USA Today
9th - James Berardinelli, ReelViews

Awards and nominations
Won - Love is Folly International Film Festival (Bulgaria) - "Golden Aphrodite" - Mira Nair
Nominated - Casting Society of America - "Best Feature Film Casting" - Cindy Tolan
Nominated - Gotham Awards 2007 - "Best Film" - Mira Nair & Lydia Dean Pilcher
Nominated - Independent Spirit Award - "Best Supporting Male" - Irrfan Khan

See also
Nikolai Gogol's  "The Overcoat"

References

External links

Official trailer

2006 films
2006 drama films
Adultery in films
American drama films
Indian drama films
Films about Indian Americans
English-language Indian films
English-language Japanese films
Japanese drama films
Films about immigration to the United States
Films based on American novels
Films based on Indian novels
Films directed by Mira Nair
Films set in Kolkata
Films set in New York City
Films shot in India
Films shot in New York City
Films shot in Kolkata
Fox Searchlight Pictures films
UTV Motion Pictures films
Asian-American drama films
Mirabai Films films
2000s American films
2006 independent films
2000s Japanese films